The Gallerie d'Italia - Milano is a modern and contemporary museum in Milan, Italy. Located in Piazza della Scala in the Palazzo Brentani and the Palazzo Anguissola, it hosts 195 artworks from the collections of Fondazione Cariplo with a strong representation of nineteenth century Lombard painters and sculptors, including Antonio Canova and Umberto Boccioni. A new section was opened in the Palazzo della Banca Commerciale Italiana on October 25, 2012 with 189 art works from the twentieth century.

During the 2017 Corporate Art Awards Ceremony hosted by the President of the Italian Republic Sergio Mattarella at the Quirinal Palace, Gallerie d'Italia - Milano received a special award as “Patron of the XXI century”.

Nineteenth Century

Sections

Section I: Canova bas reliefs 
The works of Antonio Canova in Rezzonico reliefs. Between Socratic Homeric epics and ethics, between Christian virtues and enlightened philanthropy (Rooms 1, 2, 3 and 4).

Section II: Hayez and painters of Romanticism 
Francesco Hayez and the great romantic themes. Between historic painting and melodrama (Room 5).

Section III: Giovanni Migliara and Vedutistas of the Romanticism 
Giovanni Migliara and the picturesque charm of the ancient monuments. Molteni, Pietro Ronzoni, il Piccio, Angelo Inganni, protagonists of the Lombard Romanticism (Rooms 6 and 7).

Section IV: historic depictions of the Risorgimiento
Gerolamo Induno, Sebastiano De Albertis and the Risorgimento (Rooms 8 and 9).

Section V: Vedute of the Cathedral of Milan 
The image of Milan in the view and perspective of painting. The cathedral (Rooms 10, 11, 12 and 13).

Section VI: Vedute of Navigli 
The image of Milan. The popular appeal of the Navigli (Room 14).

Section VII: Lombard Vedute 
The Lombard landscape. Between the evocative poetry of Manzoni and the quest for truth. (Room  15).

Section VIII: Revival of the Bourgeois Salon 
The revival of the eighteenth century in the bourgeois salon (Room 16).

Section IX: genre scenes 
The genre painting. Scenes from the life of the people (Rooms 17 and 18).

Section X: from the Macchiaioli to the Divisionists 
From the Macchiaioli to the Divisionists. The atmospheric trial on the real (Room 18).

Section XI: Alpine vedute 
Alpine painting. From the sublime poetry to the landscape as an expression of feelings and emotions (Rooms 19 and 20).

Section XII: Symbolism 
Symbolism. Between nature and allegory (Rooms 21 and 22).

Section XIII: Umberto Boccioni. From Pointillism to Futurism 
Umberto Boccioni. From Pointillism to Futurism (Room 23).

Twentieth Century

Sections

Ouverture 1 
 Section 1, Room 1: The memory of the image and its repression
 Section 2, Rooms 2-3-4: Lucio Fontana, Spatialism and the Nuclear Movement
 Section 3, Room 5: "Concrete" Abstract art between the Forties and the Fifties (MAC - Movimento Arte Concreta)
 Section 4, Room 6: Painting beyond painting. Action, tracks, imprints
 Section 5, Room 7: Forms of Informel
 Monographia 1, Room 8: Colour as a plastic form. A journey through a form of abstraction
 Monographia 2, Room 9: Emilio Isgrò, Italian Time
 Section 6, Room 10: Programmed and Kinetic art

Ouverture 2 
 Section 7, Room 11: The Sixties: signs, words, narratives
 Section 8, Room 12: The Sixties: things, images
 Section 9, Room 13: Around Arte Povera
 Section 10, Room 14: Conceptual practices
 Section 11, Room 15: Constructivist ideas
 Section 12, Room 16: Late twentieth century perspectives

Artworks

See also 
 Art collections of Fondazione Cariplo

References

External links 
 
 Gallerie d'Italia - Milano

 
Art museums and galleries in Milan
Art museums established in 2011
2011 establishments in Italy
Intesa Sanpaolo buildings and structures
Contemporary art galleries in Italy
Tourist attractions in Milan